Bitchin may refer to:
Ali Bitchin (1560–1645), Italian-born Algerian privateer
Bitchin', a 2007 album by The Donnas
Bitchin, a 1999 album by Susan and the Surftones
Bitchin', a 2002 EP by We Are Scientists

See also
Bitch (disambiguation)
Bitching (disambiguation)